The 1994 CSKA season was the club's third season in the Russian Top League, the highest tier of association football in Russia.

Squad

Transfers

In:

Out:

Competitions

Top League

Results by round

Results

League table

Russian Cup

1993-94

1994-95

UEFA Cup Winners' Cup

Squad Statistics

Appearances and goals

|-
|colspan="14"|Players who left CSKA Moscow during the season:

|}

Goal Scorers

Disciplinary Record

References

PFC CSKA Moscow seasons
CSKA Moscow